The Güpfi is a mountain of the Urner Alps, overlooking Lungern in the canton of Obwalden. It lies on the range north of the Chingstuel, between the Lungerersee and the Klein Melchtal.

References

External links
 Güpfi on Hikr

Mountains of the Alps
Mountains of Obwalden
Two-thousanders of Switzerland
Mountains of Switzerland